Manuel Pérez Martínez (May 9, 1943 – February 14, 1998), also known as "El Cura Pérez" ("Pérez the Priest"), was the leader of the Colombian National Liberation Army (ELN) for over three decades. The ELN was the second-largest rebel group in Colombia at that time.

Born in Alfamén, Spain, Pérez was originally a priest, and worked in Spain, France, Haiti, and the Dominican Republic. Following his defrocking and expulsion from the Dominican Republic in 1968, he went to Colombia and joined the ELN in 1969. He became the group's leader some time in the 1970s and remained so until his death in 1998 from hepatitis B. His leadership is thought to have significantly affected the ELN's ideology (Cuban-style Marxism and liberation theology).

References

1943 births
1998 deaths
Deaths from hepatitis
Infectious disease deaths in Colombia
Members of the National Liberation Army (Colombia)
People from the Province of Zaragoza
Spanish emigrants to Colombia